Saint Mac Nisse (died 514) was an early Irish saint known as the founder and first bishop-abbot of Connor (Irish: Condere, in what is now Co. Antrim). In the Tripartite Life of St. Patrick, he is said to have been a disciple of St. Olcán, Bishop of Armoy.

His story as known is largely legendary He is said to have been baptized by Saint Patrick. Oengus Mac Nisse is thought to have been at Kells as a hermit earlier in his life. He is considered the founder of Kells monastery.

References

Primary sources
 Tripartite Life of St Patrick
 Félire Óengusso
 Annals of Ulster
 Life of St. Nisse (Codex Salmanticensis), ed. W.W. Heist, Vitae Sanctorum Hiberniae ex codice olim Salmanticensi nunc Bruxellensi. Brussels, 1965. p. 406. Short, late homily for the saint's festival (3 September) at Connor.

6th-century Irish bishops
6th-century Christian saints
514 deaths
Medieval saints of Ulster
People from County Meath
People from County Antrim
Year of birth unknown